This is a list of actors and actresses who have had roles on the soap opera Guiding Light.

Cast members

References

Lists of actors by soap opera television series